Almagreira may refer to the following places in Portugal:

Almagreira (Pombal)
Almagreira (Vila do Porto)